Dawn Mills is a small, unincorporated community in southwestern Ontario, Canada, part of the municipality of Chatham-Kent.  It is in the north-central portion of the municipality, located a short distance from the town of Dresden.

In 1837, William Taylor and James Smith erected a saw, grist and wool mill on the banks of the Sydenham River in Camden Township of Kent County, Ontario near Dresden, Ontario. The mills were welcomed by residents at Dawn Mills who previously had to transport their produce for milling to Detroit by canoe. An early road was built here near the Sydenham River which connected the mill settlements.

The town grew to six streets, three hotels, church and a store. The population was around 100.

In the 1860s a railway system was constructed in southern Ontario. Stations were built, and tracks were laid at the bigger (and also purpose-established) towns. As had many other communities the region, Dawn Mills lost industries to competition from larger milling enterprises elsewhere. By the early 1900s Dawn Mills became a ghost town. The post office closed in 1918.

The church in Dawn Mills still stands, purchased by a Mennonite congregation in the 1990s. The building was built as a Methodist church.  It became a United Church and part of the Dawn Mills Pastoral Charge (comprising Dawn Mills, Wabash and Lindsay Road United Churches) in 1925, after  church union. The charge was discontinued in 1968, and the building was sold to Dawn Mills community members for $1. The Dawn Mills Good Will Workers held regular meetings and social events there for a number of years.  The hall was also rented out for family birthday parties, community wedding showers, etc.

The Old Colony Mennonite Church first rented, and later purchased the church building.  The original stained glass windows, donated by the Elgie and the Holmes families, were removed.

The general store and post office is now a home, as well as the church manse.  The community is mainly farm-related now, and several residents including the Elgie family have tried to maintain the history of the Dawn Mills community.

External links

Ghost towns in Ontario
Communities in Chatham-Kent
Mennonitism in Ontario
Old Colony Mennonites
Russian Mennonite diaspora in Canada